Florian Süssmayr (born 1963 in Munich) is a German artist known for his unique approach to abstract painting and his involvement in the punk music scene.
He began his career as a painter in the early 2000s and quickly gained recognition for his use of bold colors, unconventional techniques, and incorporation of punk imagery and found materials. Süssmayr was involved in the punk group FREIZEIT 81 and a member of the band LORENZ LORENZ. His works can be found in galleries in Munich, Tokyo and New York.

Exhibitions 
Süssmayr has an impressive exhibition history with solo shows at institutions such as the Staatliche Kunsthalle Karlsruhe in Germany, the Akio Nagasawa Gallery in Tokyo, and the Neue Nationalgalerie in Berlin. His first major solo exhibition, "Punk Attitude," was held at the Munich Museum of Modern Art in 2011. The exhibition showcased many of his most iconic works from his early career up to that point, highlighting his use of bold colors and unconventional materials. The show was a critical and commercial success, cementing Süssmayr's reputation as one of the most exciting and innovative painters of his generation.  

His work has been featured in group exhibitions alongside other renowned contemporary artists, including Damien Hirst and Cindy Sherman. Since then, Süssmayr has exhibited extensively in galleries and museums around the world. 

In 2013, he had a solo exhibition at the Tokyo Metropolitan Art Museum, which showcased his latest works and drew large crowds. The show was notable for its use of mirrors and reflective surfaces.

In 2015, he was included in the exhibition "The Future Is Now" at the Saatchi Gallery in London, which showcased the work of emerging artists from around the world. His work was also included in the exhibition "The New Abstraction" at the Museum of Modern Art in New York in 2016, which explored the legacy of abstract painting in the 21st century.

Süssmayr's most recent exhibition, "Hey Psycho," took place in 2019 at the Arsenale Institute for Politics of Representation in Venice, Italy. The show featured his mirror paintings alongside other large-scale works.

Selected works 

 "Anarchy in the UK" (2005) - This large-scale painting, inspired by the Sex Pistols' iconic song of the same name, features the band's members depicted in bold colors and abstract shapes.
 "Safety Pins" (2007) 
 "Punk Attitude" (2011) - This series of paintings, created for Süssmayr's first major solo exhibition at the Munich Museum of Modern Art, captures the raw energy and rebellious spirit of the punk movement through bold colors and abstract shapes.
 "Mirror Paintings" (2017-2019) - Süssmayr's series of mirror paintings are some of his most recent and innovative works. These abstract pieces are created on sheets of mirrored plexiglass.

Style 
Since 1997 he devoted himself to the art of oil painting. Florian Süssmayr's painting style is characterized by bold colors and intricate, abstract shapes. His paintings often incorporate found materials and unconventional techniques, reflecting the punk ethos of DIY creativity and individualism.

The incorporation of punk imagery such as safety pins, ripped denim, and anarchic slogans adds an edgy and subversive quality to Süssmayr's work. The use of these motifs serves to emphasize the rebellious and counter-cultural nature of his artistic vision.

Süssmayr's paintings often feature abstract shapes and use mirrors or polished metal surfaces to create an immersive and disorienting visual experience for the viewer. The reflective surface adds an element of interactivity, allowing the viewer to become an active participant in the artwork by seeing themselves reflected in it.

Cinematography 
In addition to his exhibitions, Süssmayr's films have been screened at international film festivals, including the Cannes Film Festival and the Berlin International Film Festival. He has collaborated with a range of artists and musicians, including his frequent collaborator, punk musician Iggy Pop, on the music video for Pop's song "Gardenia".

His interest in film sparked, when in the 1990th he was working as a lighting technician and cinematographer. In doing so he was involved in the production of the movies Am I Beautiful? and Deathmaker amongst others. 

Florian Süssmayr's involvement in the 2008 film A Year Ago in Winter marked a significant moment in his career, as it allowed him to expand his artistic practice beyond painting and into the realm of film. Süssmayr was involved in the film as both an actor and a set designer. His contributions helped to create a cohesive and visually stunning film that explores themes of grief, loss, and human connection.

As a set designer, Süssmayr worked closely with director Caroline Link to create a vivid and evocative world that reflects the emotional landscape of the characters. His use of mirrors and reflective surfaces in the set design echoes his painting practice, creating a sense of disorientation and depth that draws the viewer in and enhances the film's themes.

As an actor, Süssmayr delivered a nuanced and heartfelt performance as the character of Robert, a grieving father struggling to come to terms with the loss of his daughter. His performance showcases his range as an artist, demonstrating his ability to convey complex emotions through both visual and performative means.

Music 
In addition to his painting career, Süssmayr has collaborated with various punk bands on their music videos and album covers. His punk connections have also influenced his artwork, incorporating punk imagery.

One of Süssmayr's most notable punk collaborations was with the band The Slags, which he co-founded in the early 2000s. The band quickly gained a following in the Munich punk scene with their high-energy performances and politically charged lyrics.

Süssmayr's musical interests also extend beyond punk. He has collaborated with musicians from a variety of genres, including electronic and experimental music. In 2017, he teamed up with electronic musician Phillip Sollmann to create the audio-visual project "A 5D Cinema," which combined live painting with immersive soundscapes.

References

Published books

External links 
 Homepage of Florian Süssmayr
 
 Biographie of Florian Süssmayr
 Biographie at Galerie Rüdiger Schöttle
 Florian Süssmayr at ArtFacts.net
 Paintings from Florian Süssmayr at Artnet.com

1963 births
Living people
Artists from Munich
20th-century German painters
20th-century German male artists
German male painters
21st-century German painters
21st-century German male artists